Nitin Nabin Sinha is an Indian politician and social activist. He is the son of veteran BJP leader Nabin Kishore Sinha. He is 4 times MLA from Bankipur. He won with approx 84,000 votes in 2020 Bihar Legislative Elections. In the last election he defeated Luv Sinha, son of Shatrughan Sinha by a huge margin. Pushpam Priya Chaudhry also lost this election to him by a huge margin. He is a member of Bihar Legislative Assembly representing Bankipur constituency of Patna district. He was also National General Secretary of BJYM.

On 2 March 2017, Nabin filed a case against Bihar Indian National Congress leader Abdul Jalil Mastan for sedition and questioned his citizenship. Mastan had allegedly asked a crowd at a rally to hit a photo of Prime Minister Narendra Modi with shoes. He is State President of BJYM Bihar.

References

4. Nitin Nabin is BJYM Youth President of Bihar . news18.com

1980 births
Living people
People from Patna
Bharatiya Janata Party politicians from Bihar
Bihar MLAs 2020–2025